is a passenger railway station located in the city of Himeji, Hyōgo Prefecture, Japan, operated by West Japan Railway Company (JR West).

Lines

Station layout
The station consists of two ground-level opposed side platforms connected by a footbridge. The station is unattended.

Platforms

History
Harima-Takaoka Station opened on September 1, 1930.  With the privatization of the Japan National Railways (JNR) on April 1, 1987, the station came under the aegis of the West Japan Railway Company.

Passenger statistics
In fiscal 2019, the station was used by an average of 1731 passengers daily.

Surrounding area
 Japan National Route 2
 Seiban Driving School
 Chichibu Mountain Park

See also
List of railway stations in Japan

References

External links

  

Railway stations in Himeji
Railway stations in Japan opened in 1930